Sarah Pepall is a justice of the Court of Appeal for Ontario. She is a graduate of McGill University Faculty of Law. She has also previously served on the Ontario Superior Court of Justice.

References

Justices of the Court of Appeal for Ontario
McGill University Faculty of Law alumni
Canadian women judges
Living people
Year of birth missing (living people)
Place of birth missing (living people)